Millport is the third solo album by Bad Religion lead singer Greg Graffin, released on March 10, 2017.

Track listing

References 

2017 albums
Greg Graffin albums
Anti- (record label) albums
Albums produced by Brett Gurewitz